Timoga Springs is a collection of springs located at Timoga-Buru-un, in Iligan City, Philippines. It is well known for icy-cool, crystal-clear springs that flow freely to swimming pools of different sizes. There are approximately five spring resorts along the highway, which is easily accessible by land to all locals and tourists.

The source of water of Timoga Springs comes from Lake Lanao in Marawi City, Lanao del Sur—which is 37 kilometers away.  Lake Lanao waters come from a volcanic source, the lake being the crater of an extinct volcano. These waters are filtered underground in the Timoga, Buru-un area of Iligan, making it one of the richest source of fresh, high-pH, alkaline mineral water.

Lake Lanao is categorized as the largest fresh water lake in the Philippines, since findings show that Laguna Lake has salt water intrusion.

An ongoing project using its pristine waters for bulk water exportation and mineral water distribution is now being undertaken by Arnold A. Garbanzos, a member of the Rotary Club of Iligan, in coordination with the Macapagal-Dela Cruz-Macaraeg families and the Marzo family.  The project is called Lanao Halal Waters and is intended to make Iligan and Marawi the "hydro dollar capital" of the Philippines.  Its main markets are the Middle East, India and China, where water is scarce.  The intention is to create a Cooperative and a Foundation where the Tri-people of Iligan can participate.

Out of the Lanao Halal Waters projects, the Hajj Fund, will be developed – where the City of Iligan can send Muslims for a pilgrimage to Mecca.  The Hajj Fund is a percentage given to the Islamic City of Marawi for the sale of the waters of Timoga in its projected bulk water export activities.  Lanao Halal Waters also intends to start the "Water for Oil Exchange" between the Middle East and Iligan-where black gold (oil) is exchanged for blue gold (fresh waters), an original project envisioned by then Senator Benigno Aquino.

To protect the integrity of the waters of Timoga Springs and Lake Lanao, the Save Lake Lanao Movement (SALLAM) is in partnership with the Lanao Halal Waters in order to encourage Philippine legislators to create the Lake Lanao-Agus River Basin Authority (LLARBA).

SALLAM, Lanao Halal Waters and the Rotary Club of Iligan wrote the DENR to classify the waters of Lake Lanao as class "A"-thereby opening great economic possibilities for these waters.

References

Springs of the Philippines
Landforms of Lanao del Norte
Tourist attractions in Iligan